Antioch, Tennessee shooting may refer to:

Burnette Chapel shooting, which occurred in 2017
Nashville Waffle House shooting, which occurred in 2018